Lawry Flynn (born 4 March 1998) is an Australian professional golfer currently playing on the PGA Tour of Australasia. His highest official world golf ranking was 774th in March 2022

Early golf career
Flynn started playing golf at the age of 9. Hailing from Dalby in the Darling Downs region of south-west Queensland,  the access to private golf clubs and academy programs as a junior was limited. The foundation of Flynn’s swing developed on the family farm in Dalby. With 500 acres of space, Flynn built two holes and his very own bunker.

In 2017 Flynn won the 117th Malaysian Amateur Open.

Professional career
Flynn made the decision to turn professional on the 9th of July 2021, winning on his debut at the Maroochy River Pro-Am on the PGA Tour of Australasia.

Flynn shot a roundd of 62 (eight-under) in the third round of the Western Australian Open to earn a spot in the final group on Sunday and finished a tied fifth.

Flynn equaled an Australiasian Tour record for the  held by Paul Gow (2001 Canon Challenge), Ernie Els (2004 Heineken Classic), Alistair Presnell (2010 Victorian PGA) and broke the tournament record of 60 (11-under par) at Bonnie Doon Golf Club TPS Syndey, missing a birdie putt on the final hole to stand alone.

References

Living people
1998 births